The Long Beach Barracudas were a minor league baseball team located in Long Beach, California. The team played in the independent Western Baseball League and was not affiliated with any Major League Baseball team. Their home stadiums were Long Beach State's 49er Field and Blair Field.

The Barracudas were founded in 1995, but changed name to the Long Beach Riptide in 1996. After the 1996 season the team relocated to Mission Viejo, California as the Mission Viejo Vigilantes.

External links
Baseball Reference

Western Baseball League teams
Sports in Long Beach, California
Baseball teams established in 1995
Defunct independent baseball league teams
Professional baseball teams in California
Sports clubs disestablished in 1996
Defunct baseball teams in California